Arely Abigaíl Muciño Reyes (born 20 May 1989) is a Mexican professional boxer. She held the IBF female flyweight title in 2011, the WBC female flyweight title from 2014 to 2015 and the WBO female flyweight title from 2018 to 2019. As of September 2020, she is ranked as the second best active female flyweight by The Ring and BoxRec.

Muciño is a PE teacher in Nuevo León and possesses a bachelor's degree from the Universidad Autónoma de Nuevo León.

Biography
Arely Muciño was born in Monterrey, Mexico on 20 May 1989 to José Juan Muciño, who would become her manager. Among her family are three sisters, who are boxers as well albeit amateurs. Muciño began boxing at 13, coached and trained by her father, himself an amateur boxer. She won twelve championships with a record of 30-2, eventually being invited to box in Argentina but declining to continue her schooling. Muciño finally entered professional boxing on 7 February 2008, when she fought Alma Florez Bueno to a draw in Florez's hometown, Ciudad Nezahualcóyotl. At a four-round rematch on 19 June the same year, Muciño defeated Florez by unanimous vote by the presiding judges.

References

External links
 

Living people
1989 births
Mexican women boxers
Boxers from Nuevo León
International Boxing Federation champions
World Boxing Council champions
World Boxing Organization champions
Autonomous University of Nuevo León alumni
Flyweight boxers
Sportspeople from Monterrey